"Beer and Bones" is a song written by Sanger D. Shafer and Lonnie Williams, and recorded by American country music artist John Michael Montgomery.  It was released in July 1993 as the third and final single from his 1992 debut album Life's a Dance. The song reached No. 21 on the Billboard Hot Country Singles & Tracks chart.

Chart performance

References

1992 songs
1993 singles
John Michael Montgomery songs
Songs written by Sanger D. Shafer
Song recordings produced by Doug Johnson (record producer)
Atlantic Records singles